Rajendra Singh Patel is an Indian politician. He is an MLA from 238-Jahanabad constituency in Fatehpur district of Uttarpradesh. He became MLA for a second time in 2022 general election. He contested election for the first time in 1996 from 239-Bindki constituency and became Rural development minister. He is famous among the people due to his politeness, kindness and simplicity. He is also famous among the people as विकासपुरुष as he did much unprecedented development work in 239-Bindki constituency during his ministerial tenure 1997-2002.

In 1996, he was elected to the Uttar Pradesh Legislative Assembly from Bindki on a BSP ticket. However, in February 1998 he was among the five BSP MLAs who joined the Jantantrik Bahujan Samaj Party and voted in support of the BJP candidate Kalyan Singh for the post of Chief Minister. Patel was rewarded with a minister portfolio, serving as Minister of Rural Engineering Service and later as Minister of Rural Development. He resigned in January 2002, after the BJP announced it would field its own candidate for the Bindki seat in the 2002 Assembly polls.

Patel nevertheless contested the Bindki seat in 2002 on behalf of the Lok Janshakti Party, but finished second. For the 2007 and 2012 Assembly elections, he was the BJP candidate from Bindki, but lost on both occasions to Sukhdev Prasad Verma of the BSP. He did not contest the 2017 election.
Now in 2022 he fought from BJP ticket against 3 times MLA Madan Gopal Verma (SP) and Aditya Pandey (BSP) in Jahanabad constituency and recorded unprecedented victory with good margin of votes despite adverse conditions. This is the first time victory of any BJP candidate after independence in 238-Jahanabad constituency. Rajendra has two boys named Rahul and Rohit, Rahul is working in TCS as software engineer and Rohit is deputed as Junior Engineer in DMRC Organisation.

References 

Living people
Uttar Pradesh MLAs 1997–2002
Year of birth missing (living people)
Bharatiya Janata Party politicians from Uttar Pradesh
Lok Janshakti Party politicians
Bahujan Samaj Party politicians from Uttar Pradesh
Uttar Pradesh MLAs 2022–2027